Sigtuna väravad is a compilation of novels by Estonian author Karl Ristikivi. It was first published in 1968 in Lund, Sweden by Eesti Kirjanike Kooperatiiv (Estonian Writers' Cooperative). In Estonia it was published in 2004.

1968 novels
Novels by Karl Ristikivi